Cleto de Jesús González Víquez (13 October 1858 – 23 September 1937) was, on two occasions, the President of Costa Rica, firstly as the 18th president in 1906 and lastly as the 26th president in 1928. Don Cleto was born in Barva, Heredia on October 13, 1858, as the son of Cleto González Pérez and Aurora Víquez Murillo. He was a renowned Costa Rican politician, lawyer, and historian.

He married in 1889 to Adela Herrán Bonilla and died in San José, Costa Rica on September 23, 1937.
Cleto González Víquez was given the title of Benemérito de la Patria on October 5, 1944.

President of Costa Rica

Don Cleto began his political career at a young age. He was a mayor of San José, Secretary of the State of President Bernardo Soto Alfaro, Undersecretary of the Government and Police, among other offices.

He also became president of the College of Lawyers and of the Junta de Caridad de San José (today the Junta de Protección Social).

From 1890 until 1902 he belonged to the opposition party. In 1905 he was elected President of the Republic of Costa Rica for the first time. He governed with a lot of tact, taking into account that he did not have a majority in Congress.

During his second term in office, from 1928 to 1932, González Víquez used Keynesian ideas to stave off further effects of the Great Depression. He increased public spending and ratcheted up public infrastructure projects.

Main achievements of Cleto González Víquez's administration:

 He concluded the railroad to the Pacific in 1910 
 He dictated the first Law of Railroads 
 He expanded the System of Pipes of San José.  
 He built the old building of the National Library 
 Reinforced the municipal services 
 He created the accounts receivable of Work in 1928 and Social Forecast and impulsed the making of a Code of Work
 He was prompted the accounts receivable of Agriculture they were created and Stockbreeding and the National Service of Electricity in 1928 
 He created the attorney general's office of the Republic 
 He founded the National Patronage of the Infancy 
 He founded the First National Business of Air Transportations in 1932
 Inaugurated the dock of Puntarenas in 1928 
 Paved the streets of San José

References

External links
 Expresidentes de Costa Rica (Spanish)

|-

1858 births
1937 deaths
Presidents of Costa Rica
Vice presidents of Costa Rica
People from Heredia Province
National Union Party (Costa Rica) politicians
Foreign ministers of Costa Rica
Costa Rican liberals